Ildikó Tóth (born 29 August 1966) is a Hungarian actress. She appeared in more than thirty films since 1985.

Selected filmography

References

External links 

1966 births
Living people
Hungarian film actresses